This is a list of seasons of Ängelholm-based Swedish ice hockey club Rögle BK.

References

Ice hockey-related lists